Amybeth McNulty (born 7 November 2001) is an Irish-Canadian actress. She is known for her starring role as Anne Shirley in the CBC/Netflix drama series Anne with an E (2017–2019), based on the 1908 novel Anne of Green Gables by Lucy Maud Montgomery.

Early life
Amybeth McNulty was born on 7 November 2001 in Milford, County Donegal, Ireland, the only daughter of an Irish father and a Canadian mother. She also has Scottish heritage. She was homeschooled. She was a member of An Grianán's "Youth Theatre", where she trained in acting and ballet.

Career
McNulty's stage experience began with ballet and amateur performances at An Grianán's "Youth Theatre", which was facilitated by Nora Kavanagh, as well as musicals by the writer and composer Paul Boyd. In 2014, McNulty co-starred in the RTÉ One series Clean Break as inquisitive child Jenny Rane. In 2015, McNulty appeared in Agatha Raisin as the younger version of the titular character and guest-starred in CBBC's The Sparticle Mystery. McNulty made her film debut in sci-fi thriller Morgan, portraying the 10-year old iteration of the titular character. The film received mixed reviews.

From 2017 to 2019, she starred as Anne Shirley in the CBC and Netflix drama series Anne with an E, an adaptation of the 1908 novel series Anne of Green Gables by Lucy Maud Montgomery. McNulty was cast from a selection of 1800 girls for her ability to deliver dialogue which is "incredibly thick and dynamic and beautiful"; her audition consisted of talking to trees, chatting with flowers and building thrones out of twigs." McNulty received critical acclaim for her portrayal; Gwen Inhat of The A.V. Club lauded her "absolute possession" of Anne as well as her ability to make "fanciful language sing", while Neil Genzlinger from The New York Times wrote McNulty's performance was "wonderfully ebullient and eminently likable". Her portrayal earned her the Canadian Screen Award for Best Television Actress and the ACTRA Award for Best Performance – Female.

McNulty portrayed the lead role in Maternal, the feature directorial debut of actress Megan Follows, which was filmed in early 2020. She also starred in Black Medicine (2020), in which she portrays an alcoholic and drug-addicted Irish teenager. In December 2020, McNulty was cast in director Michael McGowan's film adaptation of All My Puny Sorrows, a novel by Canadian author Miriam Toews. In June 2021, McNulty was cast in season four of the Netflix drama Stranger Things, portraying  Vickie, a "cool, fast-talking band nerd".

Personal life
At 19, McNulty moved out from her family home in rural Donegal to London. In June 2020, she came out as bisexual.  McNulty is a vegetarian.

In November 2021, McNulty's mother died.

Filmography

Awards and nominations

References

External links

2001 births
Living people
Actresses from County Donegal
Best Actress in a Drama Series Canadian Screen Award winners
Bisexual actresses
Canadian expatriates in England
Canadian people of Irish descent
Canadian people of Scottish descent
Irish child actresses
Irish emigrants to Canada
Irish expatriates in England
Irish film actresses
Irish people of Canadian descent
Irish people of Scottish descent
Irish television actresses
Irish LGBT actors
People from Letterkenny
21st-century Canadian actresses
21st-century Irish actresses
21st-century LGBT people